Franc Luz (born December 22, 1950) is an American actor of stage, film and television seen in popular leading dramatic film roles in the 1980s and 1990s. These credits were supplemented with TV guest appearances and several regular roles in TV series. Luz is perhaps best known for his parts in The Nest, Ghost Town, When Harry Met Sally..., and, to Star Trek fans, as the symbiont Odan in a 1991 episode of Star Trek: The Next Generation, in the season 4 episode "The Host".

Career

Beginnings
Luz hails from Massachusetts and is of Portuguese and Irish descent. He attended New Mexico State University, with the intention of studying and breaking into dramatic arts as a career. He studied both singing and theater arts to double his future prospects in show business. After graduation, Luz won parts in many local and regional theater productions. His first breakthrough arrived in the late 1970s, when he landed the major role of policeman Floyd in Fiorello, which ran at the Equity Liberty Theater in New York City. In 1979, he received attention playing Wanenis, the noble North American savage in the period piece Whoopee!. Both of the latter led to his first movie role, which also arrived that year; he was cast in a supporting part in the film Voices.

On the heels of this film exposure, Luz made his first transition to television. He auditioned for and won the role of Dr. John Bennett on NBC's daytime serial The Doctors. This role made him instantly noticed by daytime viewers, and he was nominated for a 1980 Daytime Emmy Award for Outstanding Lead Actor in a Drama Series. Luz continued in the role for another year before leaving the show in 1981. During this period, Luz made an appearance as one of the cast of stars on the NBC daytime version of The Hollywood Squares on the week of December 4, 1979, as a part of the show's soap opera week. Luz was featured in the top left-hand corner square alongside Nancy Pinkerton, his co-star from The Doctors.

1980s

After his departure from The Doctors, Luz returned to theatre work. He was often seen in the early 1980s playing the role of the sadistic dentist in the original off-Broadway production of Little Shop of Horrors. For this, he was nominated for the 1983 Drama Desk Award in the Outstanding Featured Actor in a Musical category. The voices of Luz, Lee Wilkof, Jennifer Leigh Warren and others are featured in the 1992 CD release Little Shop of Horrors Soundtrack - Original Off-Broadway Cast.

Along the way, he joined other daytime soaps; in 1983, he played Tommy Lobo on One Life to Live. Shortly after, he appeared on Ryan's Hope for a particularly heated story arc in 1984; he played Steve Latham, lover of Delia Reid Ryan Coleridge (played at the time by Robin Mattson), who held Delia captive while she was still committed to marry Matthew Crane (Harve Presnell). Their affair was indirectly responsible for leading Crane to accuse Delia of attempted murder. Luz claimed in a 1985 interview that playing Steve Latham was particularly satisfying to him as an actor, since he got to play a sinister character who wasn't hapless or taken advantage of. His previous roles on The Doctors and One Life to Live were "nice guys" who had their lovers stolen away by more ruthless counterparts.

In 1985, Luz assumed a co-starring role on a primetime series, the CBS dramedy Hometown, a TV adaptation of the hit 1983 film The Big Chill. Luz played the husband of Jane Kaczmarek in the series, and another co-star was Daniel Stern. The series did not fare well in the ratings, however, and was cancelled after two months. He appeared in a recurring role on another new CBS series the following season, playing the ex-boyfriend of Patricia Kalember in the medical drama Kay O'Brien. This series, too, was cancelled after two months.

Guest roles for Luz in 1987 included Dee Dee McCall's late police sergeant husband, in flashbacks, on Hunter and Professor Richard Katt, who was rumored to have had an extramarital affair with student Blair Warner, on The Facts of Life.

Luz then assumed two leading roles in the popular 1988 horror films The Nest, in which he led a team of scientists who battled man-eating cockroaches, and Ghost Town, where he played a deputy bent on protecting his Western town from ghosts and the forces of evil. The following year, he guest starred as artist Kristopher Gentian on CBS' Beauty and the Beast (in season two's "When the Bluebird Sings"), and played Julian in Rob Reiner's romantic comedy When Harry Met Sally.... After production on that film was complete, Luz signed to co-star in the ABC comedy Free Spirit, which premiered in September 1989. He portrayed lawyer Thomas J. Harper, a widower with three children who hires a housekeeper/nanny named Winnie (Corinne Bohrer), whom only the kids know is a witch. Luz's daughter on the show was played by a young Alyson Hannigan. Free Spirit turned out to be another short-lived series for Luz, as ABC cancelled it mid-season.

1990s

In the 1990s, Luz continued his string of TV guest appearances on such shows as Sisters, L.A. Law, The Young Riders, and Silk Stalkings, while keeping up appearances in motion pictures. He is best known to Star Trek fans as Beverly Crusher's Trill boyfriend Odan in "The Host" (the 97th episode of the American syndicated science fiction television series Star Trek: The Next Generation, the 23rd episode of the fourth season).  In 1991–92, he starred in the Broadway production of Larry Gelbart's City of Angels, alongside Richard Kline and Michael Rupert. He made a guest appearance on Walker, Texas Ranger as a notorious cult leader in its episode "In the Name of God". His most notable role in 1990s cinema was that of Don Antonio in Jeremy Leven's Don Juan DeMarco (1995), which starred Johnny Depp in the title role. Prior to that, Luz had appeared on daytime TV again, playing Seth Tanner on All My Children in 1993. In 1999, Luz appeared in the independent film The Pornographer and in Restraining Order, co-starring with Eric Roberts.

Beyond
A longtime enthusiast of the fine arts, Luz became involved in many New York area museums and exhibition halls since retiring from acting in 1999. He has become a trustee for several of them, and also works as a tour guide.

References

External links
 

1950 births
Living people
20th-century American male actors
American male television actors
Male actors from Cambridge, Massachusetts
New Mexico State University alumni
American people of Portuguese descent